A Mile in My Shoes may refer to:

 A Mile in My Shoes (The Fairly OddParents), an episode of The Fairly OddParents
 A Mile in My Shoes (film), a 2016 Moroccan drama film
 A Mile in My shoes (podcast), spin-off of the Empathy Museum